Służba Zwycięstwu Polski (Service for Poland's Victory, or Polish Victory Service, abbreviated SZP) was the first Polish resistance movement in World War II. It was created by the order of general Juliusz Rómmel on 27 September 1939, when the siege of Warsaw, capital of Poland, where Rómmel commanded Polish defence, was nearing its end (Warsaw would capitulate on 28 September).

The commander of SZP was General Michał Karaszewicz-Tokarzewski. This secret organisation was tasked with the continuing of armed struggle to liberate Poland in the pre-war borders of the Second Polish Republic, recreation and reorganization of the Polish army and establishment of the secret government (Polish Underground State).

In November 1939 SZP was renamed Union of Armed Struggle (ZWZ).

See also
 Związek Walki Zbrojnej
 Home Army

References

External links
 Służba Zwycięstwu Polski (SZP).
 I. Początki Konspiracyjnego Wojska Polskiego.
 Powstanie ZWZ - AK

Polish underground organisations during World War II
1939 in Poland